The Anaheim Ducks are an American professional ice hockey team based in Anaheim, California. They are members of the Pacific Division of the Western Conference of the National Hockey League (NHL). The club was founded in 1993 by The Walt Disney Company as the Mighty Ducks of Anaheim, a name based on the 1992 film The Mighty Ducks. Disney sold the franchise in 2005 to Henry Samueli, who, along with General Manager Brian Burke, changed the name of the team to the Anaheim Ducks prior to the 2006–07 season. In twenty-nine completed seasons (2004–05 NHL season was not played) the Ducks have made the playoffs fourteen times and won six Pacific Division titles, two Western Conference championships, and one Stanley Cup championship.

Table key

Year by year

1 Season was shortened due to the 1994–95 NHL lockout.
2 Season was cancelled due to the 2004–05 NHL lockout.
3 As of the 2005–06 NHL season, all games tied after regulation will be decided in a shootout; SOL (Shootout losses) will be recorded as OTL in the standings.
4 The 2012–13 NHL season was shortened due to the 2012–13 NHL lockout.
5 The 2019–20 NHL season was suspended on March 12, 2020 due to the COVID-19 pandemic.
6 The 2020–21 NHL season was shortened due to the COVID-19 pandemic.

All-time records

References

External links
 Anaheim Ducks official website

National Hockey League team seasons
Events in Anaheim, California
Anaheim Ducks
seasons